Elections to Singapore City Council were held for the first time on 1 December 1951 to elect six of the council's 18 elected members.

Results

By constituency

References

Singapore City Council elections
1951 in Singapore
Singapore
December 1951 events in Asia